Yang Hao (Chinese: 杨浩; born 13 May 1990) is a Chinese football player who currently plays for China League One side Nanjing City F.C.

Club career
In 2010, Yang Hao started his professional footballer career with Chengdu Tiancheng in the China League One and was part of the team that gained promotion to the top tier at the end of the season. He would make his first Chinese Super League appearance for Chengdu on 24 April 2011 in a game against Nanchang Bayi, coming on as a substitute for Zhang Yuan in the 79th minute. Throughout the season he would go on to establish himself as a regular within the team, however he was part of the squad that was immediately relegated back into the second tier at the end of the 2011 Chinese Super League campaign. By the end of the 2014 China League One season the club experienced another relegation and were dissolved due to wage arrears.

On 1 July 2015, Yang  transferred to China League Two side Baoding Yingli Yitong. He would go on to establish himself as a vital member of the team and gained promotion with them at the end of the 2016 China League Two campaign as they came runners-up within the league. The following season he would unfortunately be part of the team that was relegated on head-to-head results against Dalian Transcendence F.C. at the end of the 2017 China League One campaign.

Career statistics 

Statistics accurate as of match played 31 December 2020.

References

External links
Yang Hao at Soccerway.com

1990 births
Living people
Chinese footballers
Sportspeople from Xuzhou
Footballers from Jiangsu
Chengdu Tiancheng F.C. players
Baoding Yingli Yitong players
Chinese Super League players
China League One players
Association football midfielders
21st-century Chinese people